Macroprotus is a genus of beetles in the family Carabidae, containing the following species:

 Macroprotus forticornis Chaudoir in Oberthur, 1883 
 Macroprotus tenuicornis Chaudoir, 1878

References

Licininae